The 38th General Assembly of Nova Scotia represented Nova Scotia between June 25, 1925, through September 5, 1928. The first session of this assembly was convened on February 9, 1926. There were three sessions of the assembly during this period.

The election of 1925 represented a shift in Nova Scotia politics as the 37th General Assembly would mark the return of the Conservatives to government after a forty-three year absence.

One of the most significant pieces of legislation to come out of this General Assembly is that of An Act Abolishing the Legislative Council and Amending the Constitution of the Province, in 1928. This act abolished the Legislative Council of the Nova Scotia Legislature, the legislature's upper house. When Rhodes came into office in 1926, it had only one Conservative member and 17 Liberal members, with three vacancies; Rhodes would ultimately appoint 15 new Councillors in order to pack the Council for means of abolition, while dismissing all but a handful of Liberal Councillors.

Division of seats
There were 42 members of this General Assembly, elected in the 1925 Nova Scotia general election.

List of members

Former members of the 37th General Assembly

 Barnjum resigned due to a failed election promise. Upon being nominated Barnjum promised a mill project for Queens County. By 1928 this had not happened and Barnjum resigned due to the failed promise.

References 

37
1925 establishments in Nova Scotia
1928 disestablishments in Nova Scotia
20th century in Nova Scotia